Jindřichův Hradec District is a district in the South Bohemian Region of the Czech Republic. Its capital is the town of Jindřichův Hradec.

Administrative division
Jindřichův Hradec District is divided into three administrative districts of municipalities with extended competence: Jindřichův Hradec, Dačice and Třeboň.

List of municipalities
Towns are marked in bold and market towns in italics:

Báňovice -
Bednárec -
Bednáreček -
Blažejov -
Bořetín -
Březina -
Budeč -
Budíškovice -
Cep -
Červený Hrádek -
České Velenice -
Český Rudolec -
Chlum u Třeboně -
Číměř -
Cizkrajov -
Člunek -
Dačice -
Dešná -
Deštná -
Dívčí Kopy -
Dobrohošť -
Dolní Pěna -
Dolní Žďár -
Domanín -
Doňov -
Drunče -
Dunajovice -
Dvory nad Lužnicí -
Frahelž -
Hadravova Rosička -
Halámky -
Hamr -
Hatín -
Heřmaneč -
Horní Meziříčko -
Horní Němčice -
Horní Pěna -
Horní Radouň -
Horní Skrýchov -
Horní Slatina -
Hospříz -
Hrachoviště -
Hříšice -
Jarošov nad Nežárkou -
Jilem -
Jindřichův Hradec -
Kačlehy -
Kamenný Malíkov -
Kardašova Řečice -
Klec -
Kostelní Radouň -
Kostelní Vydří -
Kunžak -
Lásenice -
Lodhéřov -
Lomnice nad Lužnicí -
Lužnice -
Majdalena -
Nová Bystřice -
Nová Olešná -
Nová Včelnice -
Nová Ves nad Lužnicí -
Novosedly nad Nežárkou -
Okrouhlá Radouň -
Peč -
Písečné -
Pístina -
Plavsko -
Pleše -
Pluhův Žďár -
Polště -
Ponědraž -
Ponědrážka -
Popelín -
Příbraz -
Rapšach -
Ratiboř -
Rodvínov -
Roseč -
Rosička -
Slavonice -
Smržov -
Staňkov -
Staré Hobzí -
Staré Město pod Landštejnem -
Stráž nad Nežárkou -
Strmilov -
Stříbřec -
Střížovice -
Studená -
Suchdol nad Lužnicí -
Světce -
Třebětice -
Třeboň -
Újezdec -
Velký Ratmírov -
Vícemil -
Višňová -
Vlčetínec -
Volfířov -
Vydří -
Záblatí -
Záhoří -
Zahrádky -
Žďár -
Županovice

Geography

It borders Austria in the south. About a fifth of the district territory in the east belongs to the historical land of Moravia.

The relief is rugged and hilly except in the west, which belongs to a tectonic depression. The territory extends into four geomorphological mesoregions: Javořice Highlands (south and centre), Třeboň Basin (west), Křemešník Highlands (north) and Křižanov Highlands (east).

The territory is rich in watercourses and ponds. The most important rivers are the Lužnice and its tributary, the Nežárka, both flowing through the western part of the district. The eastern part is drained by the Moravian Thaya. The area of the Třeboň Basin is known for its fishpond system, which includes the largest pond in the country Rožmberk and many other large ponds.

The western part of the district is protected as the Třeboňsko Protected Landscape Area.

Demographics

Most populated municipalities

Economy
The largest employers with its headquarters in Jindřichův Hradec District and at least 500 employers are:

Transport
There are no motorways in the district. The most important roads are I/24 and I/34, which leads from České Budějovice through the western part of the district to the border with Austria, and are part of the European route E49.

Sights

The most important monuments in the district, protected as national cultural monuments, are:
Jindřichův Hradec Castle
Augustinian monastery with the Church of Saint Giles in Třeboň
Červená Lhota Castle
Dačice Castle
Třeboň Castle 
Fishponds of the Třeboň Basin
Water saw in Stoječín-Penikov

The best-preserved settlements, protected as monument reservations and monument zones, are:

Jindřichův Hradec (monument reservation)
Slavonice (monument reservation)
Třeboň (monument reservation)
Dačice
Nová Bystřice
Hrutkov
Lutová
Malíkov nad Nežárkou
Nová Ves
Pístina
Plačovice
Ponědrážka
Příbraz
Žíteč

The most visited tourist destination is the narrow gauge railway line operated by Jindřichohradecké místní dráhy.

References

External links

Jindřichův Hradec District profile on the Czech Statistical Office's website

 
Districts of the Czech Republic